Madagasikaria is a genus in the Malpighiaceae, a family of about 75 genera of flowering plants in the order Malpighiales. Madagasikaria contains only one species (Madagasikaria andersonii) of woody vine native to deciduous seasonally dry forest of Madagascar.

References

Davis, C. 2002. Madagasikaria (Malpighiaceae): a new genus from Madagascar with implications for floral evolution in Malpighiaceae. American Journal of Botany 89: 699–706.

External links
Malpighiaceae Malpighiaceae - description, taxonomy, phylogeny, and nomenclature
Madagasikaria

Malpighiaceae
Malpighiaceae genera
Monotypic Malpighiales genera